Jiří Hradil is a former Czechoslovak slalom canoeist who competed in the 1950s. He won three medals at the ICF Canoe Slalom World Championships with a gold (C-1 team: 1955) and two bronzes (C-1 team: 1957, C-2 team: 1953).

References

External links 
 Jiri HRADIL at CanoeSlalom.net

Czechoslovak male canoeists
Medalists at the ICF Canoe Slalom World Championships

Possibly living people
Year of birth missing